The South West German Football Association, the SWFV, is one of 21 state organisations of the German Football Association, the DFB, and covers the southern part of the state of Rhineland-Palatinate.

The SWFV is also part of the Southwestern Regional Football Association, one of five regional federations in Germany. The other member of the regional association are the Rhineland Football Association and the Saarland Football Association.

In 2017, the SWFV had 234,322 members, 1,036 member clubs and 5,371 teams playing in its league system.

References

External links
 German FA website  
 Southwestern Regional FA website  
 SWFA website 

Football in Rhineland-Palatinate
Football governing bodies in Germany
1949 establishments in West Germany